Kathiawari or Kathiawadi may refer to:
 something of, from, or related to the Kathiawar peninsula in Gujarat, India
 Kathiawari dialect, a variety of the Gujarati language
 Kathiawari (horse), a horse breed
 Kathiawadi cattle, a breed of cow.
 Kathiawari cuisine, a variety of Gujarati cuisine.

See also 
 Kishtwari, a dialect of Kashmiri